Albert Heikenwälder (17 July 1898 – 1 July 1953) was an Austrian footballer. He played in one match for the Austria national football team in 1923.

References

External links
 

1898 births
1953 deaths
Austrian footballers
Austria international footballers
Place of birth missing
Association footballers not categorized by position